Family Rules is an Australian observational documentary television series that premiered on 9 January 2017 on NITV. It follows the household of Daniella Rule, a widow raising nine daughters in Perth, Western Australia. The second season follows the younger daughters.

References

2017 Australian television series debuts
2010s Australian reality television series
National Indigenous Television original programming
English-language television shows
Television shows set in Western Australia